Whitburn railway station served the town of East Whitburn, West Lothian, Scotland from 1850 to 1930 on the Longridge and Bathgate Extension Railway.

History 
The station was opened in August 1850 by the Edinburgh and Glasgow Railway. It had a brick building on its platform. There were sidings on both sides of the station and a signal box, that opened in 1899, to the southwest. To the east was Whitrigg Fireclay Mine and to the southeast was Whitrigg Colliery No 5. The station closed in December 1852 but reopened on 19 September 1864, before closing permanently on 1 May 1930.

References

External links 

Disused railway stations in West Lothian
Railway stations in Great Britain opened in 1850
Railway stations in Great Britain closed in 1852
Railway stations in Great Britain opened in 1864
Railway stations in Great Britain closed in 1930 
1850 establishments in Scotland
1930 disestablishments in Scotland
Former North British Railway stations